The Tenerife News is a bi-weekly English language newspaper in the Canary Islands that is published by Seven Island Media Group S.L. 

Printed in tabloid format, the paper focuses on local news in Tenerife, but also includes coverage of news on Spain.

The Tenerife News is edited by Romina Torres Hall. Regular contributors include: Rita Sobot, Steve Andrews, Vernon, Tomás Noruego, Jeremy Taylor, Alfáro and Blevins Franks. The print run is approximately 13,000 copies per issue and the paper is distributed free of charge.

References

English-language newspapers published in Africa
Free daily newspapers
Mass media in Santa Cruz de Tenerife
Newspapers published in Spain